Niveotectura pallida is a species of sea snail, a true limpet, a marine gastropod mollusk in the family Lottiidae, one of the families of true limpets.

Description

The shell can grow to be 32 mm to 60 mm.

Distribution
Niveotectura pallida can be found off of north Japan, North Korea, and Sakhalin, Russia

References

External links

Lottiidae
Gastropods described in 1859